A Debtor to the Law is a 1919 American silent Western film starring Henry Starr, a convicted bank robber, as himself. The film is about Starr's attempts to rob two banks in Stroud, Oklahoma, in 1915.

References

External links
 

1919 films
1919 Western (genre) films
American black-and-white films
Silent American Western (genre) films
1910s American films